Marie-Jeanne Lamartinière (fl. 1802), known in history only as "Marie-Jeanne", was a Haitian soldier, and reportedly a "dazzling beauty." She served in the Haitian army during the Haitian Revolution (1791–1804).

Haitian Revolution service
Marie-Jeanne served at the Battle of Crête-à-Pierrot (4 March–24 March 1802) with her husband Louis Daure Lamartinière. She fought in a male uniform standing along the fort's ramparts bearing both a rifle and a sword. She made a great impression with her fearlessness and courage, and was said to use the long rifle to snipe on the wounded French soldiers below with "a skill all the men applauded". It is said to have boosted the morale of her colleagues with her bravery.

When not fighting, Marie-Jeanne nursed her injured comrades. When describing her allocation of her scarce water supply to parched and dying troops, Bell states, "Marie-Jeanne gave water with a silver serving spoon that hung from her sash on a fine chain. From the gourd she carried as she filled the spoon just short of the brim and slipped between the jaws of [the patient]." ... [A doctor noticed] "the short knife which rode in her sash between the spoon chain and her sword. Two days before she'd slit the throat of a man so maddened by thirst he'd tried to snatch the water gourd from her — done it as neatly as any peasant woman letting blood from a hog or snapping the head off a chicken. It had been a mercy killing, for the others of the garrison would surly have torn the offender limb from limb."

Later life
Her husband Louis Daure Lamartinière was killed in battle in 1802.

Her life after the independence is unknown. An old story says that she, for a time, was involved in a relationship with emperor Jean-Jacques Dessalines, who admired her courage, and that she later married the officer Jean-Louis Larose. This is unconfirmed but comes from a contemporary source, related by one of the other soldiers at Crête-à-Pierrot, and is considered trustworthy.

Similar soldiers of note
Most women participating as soldiers during the revolution remain anonymous, and only a few, of which Marie-Jeanne is one, have been known in history. Other contemporary examples of women in the Haitian army were Victoria Montou and Sanité Belair.

References

Haitian independence activists
Women in 19th-century warfare
Women of the Haitian Revolution